The Balluderon Stone, otherwise known as Martin's Stone is a class II Pictish cross slab in situ at Balluderon, Angus, Scotland.

Description
A slab of Old Red Sandstone, the cross slab is situated in a field and protected by iron fencing. The slab, of which only the lower half remains, bears the remnants of a Celtic cross, two mounted riders, a serpent and z-rod symbol and a Pictish beast design. Local tradition associates the slab with the Legend of the Nine Maidens who were devoured by a dragon which was subsequently slain by a hero named Martin. Folk etymology names this as the origin of Strathmartine, the valley in which the slab stands.

References

External links
Entry in RCAHMS Canmore database

Pictish stones
Pictish stones in Angus, Scotland